Francisca Efigenia Meléndez y Durazzo, sometimes given as Francisca Meléndez de Múquiz (1770–1825), was a Spanish miniaturist and pastellist.

Meléndez y Durazzo was the daughter of José Agustín Meléndez, and was born in Cádiz. In 1794, she was appointed court painter. She died in Madrid.

References

1770 births
1825 deaths
18th-century Spanish painters
19th-century Spanish painters
19th-century Spanish male artists
Spanish women painters
18th-century Spanish women artists
19th-century Spanish women artists
Spanish portrait painters
Portrait miniaturists
Pastel artists
People from Cádiz